Mason Caton-Brown (born 24 May 1993) is a former rugby league footballer who played as a er or  and represented Jamaica at international level.

He has previously played for the London Broncos in the Super League, and on loan from the Broncos at the Hemel Stags in League 1. Caton-Brown has also played in the top flight for the Salford Red Devils, and Wakefield Trinity in two separate spells, and spent time on loan from Wakefield at the Dewsbury Rams in the Championship. He also played for the Toronto Wolfpack in the Betfred Championship.

He has also represented Jamaica in rugby sevens.

Background
Caton-Brown was born in Enfield, London, England. He attended Enfield Grammar School and then went on to be a boarding pupil at Mill Hill School. Caton-Brown then studied Biochemistry at Leicester University.

He represented England Students at the age of 17; winning against Scotland under-18s and Catalans Dragons under-18s.

Rugby League career
For the 2013 season, Caton-Brown played for the Hemel Stags in the Championship One after being put on dual registration to the Hemel Stags after impressive performances for the London Broncos Under-19s. He scored 9 tries in 14 appearances for the semi-professional side.

Mason Caton-Brown made his début for the London Broncos on 1 September 2013 against the Bradford Bulls after impressing (now former) head coach Tony Rea whilst playing for the Hemel Stags. He scored a try on début.

In his second game for the capital side, he scored a hat trick against the Hull Kingston Rovers on 8 September 2014.

His started the 2014 Super League season by scoring 2 tries vs the Widnes Vikings. At the Magic Weekend, head coach Joe Grima confirmed that Caton-Brown has attracted many top Super League clubs despite only playing 16 first-grade games for the club (correct on 21 May 2014).

He joined the Salford Red Devils, after being signed on a -year deal from the London Broncos.

He left Salford to join Wakefield Trinity from the 2017 season.(Heritage № 1380)

Caton-Brown represented Jamaica Rugby League against England Knights at the Headingley Rugby Stadium Scoring Jamaica's only try.

In July 2019, Wakefield announced that Caton-Brown had left the club to "pursue other business interests".

Rugby Sevens
He played for the Jamaica national rugby sevens team at the 2019 Hong Kong Sevens qualifier for the World Rugby Sevens Series. He also represented Jamaica at the 2019 Pan American Games.

Business career 
During his rugby career, Caton-Brown built an extensive property portfolio around the North West of England. In 2019 he left Wakefield Trinity to pursue other "business interests" relating to property development and e-commerce.

Career stats

References

External links
Wakefield Trinity profile
SL profile

1993 births
Living people
Dewsbury Rams players
English people of Jamaican descent
Jamaican rugby league players
English rugby league players
Hemel Stags players
Jamaica national rugby league team players
London Broncos players
Pan American Games competitors for Jamaica
Rugby league centres
Rugby league players from Greater London
Rugby league wingers
Rugby sevens players at the 2019 Pan American Games
Salford Red Devils players
Toronto Wolfpack players
Wakefield Trinity players
Rugby sevens players at the 2022 Commonwealth Games